General Milton may refer to:

Hugh M. Milton II (1897–1987), U.S. Army major general
Theodore R. Milton (1915–2010) U.S. Air Force general
Tony Milton (born 1949), Royal Marines major general